The Towson Tigers men's basketball team represents Towson University in Towson, Maryland in NCAA Division I competition. The school's team currently competes in the Colonial Athletic Association and play their home games at SECU Arena.

History

Conference memberships
1959-1978: Mason-Dixon Conference (Division II)
1979-1981: ECAC Metro South Conference
1982-1991: East Coast Conference
1992-1994: Big South Conference
1995-2000: America East Conference
2001–present: Colonial Athletic Association

Season-by-season results

Postseason results

NCAA Division I Tournament results
The Tigers have appeared in the NCAA Division I tournament two times. Their combined record is 0–2.

NIT results
The Tigers have appeared in one National Invitation Tournament (NIT). Their record is 0–1.

Vegas 16 results
The Tigers have appeared in one Vegas 16. Their record is 0–1.

CIT results
The Tigers have appeared in one CollegeInsider.com Postseason Tournament (CIT). Their record is 2–1.

NCAA Division II Tournament results
The Tigers appeared in the NCAA Division II Tournament two times. Their combined record is 3–2.

Program records

Notable players

Justin Gorham (born 1998), basketball player in the Israeli Basketball Premier League
 Ryan Lexer (born 1976), American-Israeli basketball player

References

External links